Before the Acts of Union 1707, the barons of the shire of Perth elected commissioners to represent them in the unicameral Parliament of Scotland and in the Convention of the Estates. The number of commissioners was increased from two to four in 1690.

From 1708 Perthshire was represented by one Member of Parliament in the House of Commons of Great Britain.

List of shire commissioners

1617-? George Auchinleck, Lord Balmanno
 1639–41: Sir John Moncreiff of Moncreiff
 1639–41: Thomas Ruthven of Frieland  
 1643: Patrick Kinnaird of Inchstair 
 1643: George Graeme of Invhbraikle  
 1644–45: Laird of Gleneagles (Haldane)  
 1644–45: Laird of Balhousie (Hay)  
 1645–47: Laird of Frieland (Ruthven)  
 1645–47: Lair of Aldie (Mercer)  
 1648: Laird of Inchmertene (Ogilvie) 
 1648: Laird of Balthayok (Blair)  
 1649–51: Sir Thomas Ruthven  
 1649–50: Sir John Brown  
 1650–51: Laird of Ardblair (Blair)  
 1661–63: Mungo Murray of Garth 
 1661–63: Sir George Kinnaird of Rossie  
 1665 convention, 1667 convention: Sir John Drummond of Burnbank 
 1665 convention, 1667 convention: Sir Thomas Stewart of Gairntellie  
 1669–74, 1678 convention, 1681–82, 1685–86: Lt-Gen. William Drummond of Cromlix
 1669–70: Sir Mungo Murray of Garth  (died c.1670) 
 1672: Sir Gilbert Stewart of Tillineddes (died c.1672)   
 1673–74: Sir William Murray of Ochtertyre
 1678 convention: John Graham of Fintrie 
 1681–82, 1685: Mungo Haldane of Gleneagles (died 1685) 
 1685–86: Sir John Murray of Drumcairn 
 1689 convention, 1689–93: John Haldane of Gleneagles (expelled 1693) 
 1689 convention, 1689–93: Sir James Ramsay of Bamff (expelled 1693)
 1690–1702: Sir Colin Campbell of Aberuchill
 1690–1702: Adam Drummond of Megginch  
 1693–95: Sir Alexander Menzies of that Ilk (died 1695)
 1693–97: Thomas Hay of Balhousie (ennobled as Viscount Dupplin 1697) 
 1695–1701: Robert Hay of Strowie  
 1698–1701: James Craigie the younger  
 1702: William Oliphant of Gask (died c1702) 
 1702–07: Sir Patrick Murray of Ochtertyre
 1702-07: Mungo Graham of Gorthie
 1702–07: John Haldane of Gleneagles
 1704–07: John Murray of Strowan

References

See also
 List of constituencies in the Parliament of Scotland at the time of the Union

Shires represented in the Parliament of Scotland (to 1707)
Constituencies disestablished in 1707
1707 disestablishments in Scotland
Politics of Perth and Kinross
History of Perth and Kinross